Silvia Álvarez Curbelo (born in Ponce, Puerto Rico, in 1940) is a Puerto Rican historian, and writer. She is best known for her book Un país del porvenir: el afán de modernidad en Puerto Rico (Siglo XIX).

Early years
Álvarez Curbelo was born in Ponce, Puerto Rico. She was a fellow at the David Rockefeller Center for Latin American Studies in 2004/2005.

Career
Álvarez Curbelo is a professor of Communications at the University of Puerto Rico, Río Piedras campus. She is a historian and is a founding member of the Asociación Puertorriqueña de Historiadores (Puerto Rican Association of Historians). She is curator of the Entresiglos, Puerto Rico 1890–1910 exhibition, and the permanent exhibition of the history of San Juan, Puerto Rico, at the Museo de San Juan. She is currently director of the Centro de Investigaciones en Comunicación (Center for Communications Research) at the University of Puerto Rico.

Works
Among her better known works are:  
 Un país del porvenir: el afán de modernidad en Puerto Rico (Siglo XIX) (Ediciones Callejón; San Juan, Puerto Rico) (2001)
 Del nacionalismo al populismo: Cultura y Politica en Puerto Rico. (Ediciones Huraca; Rio Piedras, Puerto Rico) (1993)
 Historias vivas: Historiografía puertorriqueña contemporánea. (1996)
 Ilusión de Francia: Arquitectura y afrancesamiento en Puerto Rico. (1997)
 Hispanofilia: Arquitectura y vida en Puerto Rico 1900–1950. (1998)
 Los arcos de la memoria: el '98 de los pueblos puertorriqueños. (1999)

Recognitions
She is honored at Ponce's Park of Illustrious Ponce Citizens.

See also

List of Puerto Ricans
List of Puerto Rican writers

References

Living people
1940 births
Writers from Ponce
20th-century Puerto Rican historians
University of Puerto Rico faculty
Puerto Rican women writers
American women historians
Historians of Puerto Rico
21st-century Puerto Rican historians